Josef Adelbrecht (10 January 1910 – 1 October 1941) was an Austrian footballer who played as a forward.

Club career
Adelbrecht started his career with First Vienna in 1928 with whom he won the Mitropa Cup in 1931. In 1934 he moved to play professionally in France only to return after two years to play for Austria Wien and Rapid Wien .

International career
He made his debut for Austria in June 1930 against Hungary and played two more internationals, scoring one goal.

World War II and death
Adelbrecht was drafted into the Wehrmacht in March 1940 and served in the 235th Infantry Regiment. He was killed in the German invasion of Russia at Ivashkovo, 100 km NW of Moscow.

Honours
 Austrian Football Bundesliga: 1931, 1933, 1938
 Austrian Cup: 1929, 1930
 Mitropa Cup: 1931

References

External links

Profile at Austria-Archiv.at 
Profile at Rapidarchiv.at 

1910 births
1941 deaths
Association football forwards
Austrian footballers
Austria international footballers
Austrian expatriate sportspeople in France
Austrian expatriate sportspeople in Switzerland
First Vienna FC players
Racing Club de France Football players
Grasshopper Club Zürich players
FK Austria Wien players
SK Rapid Wien players
Austrian Football Bundesliga players
Ligue 1 players
Austrian expatriate footballers
Expatriate footballers in France
Expatriate footballers in Switzerland
Footballers from Vienna
German Army personnel killed in World War II